Shannon Sewrani Hilversum, known professionally as Rani (stylised as RANI), is a Dutch singer-songwriter. She is best known for featuring on Sam Feldt's 2019 song ‘Post Malone’. She also provided uncredited vocals for David Guetta's 2021 single, "Get Together".
She has also provided vocals for Jonasu's 2021 single "Black Magic".

Discography

Singles

As lead artist

As featured artist

References

1999 births
Living people
Dutch women singer-songwriters
Dutch people of Indonesian descent
Dutch singer-songwriters